Defries or De Fries is a surname. Notable people with the surname include:

People 
 Colin Defries (1884–1963), English racing driver and pilot
 Graham Francis Defries, partner in the law firm Goodwin Procter
 Joel Defries (born 1985), British-born presenter
 Robert Defries (1889–1975), Canadian physician
 Tony Defries (born 1943), British music manager and impresario
 Phil De Fries (born 1987), British mixed martial artist
 Heinrich de Fries (1887–1938), German architect

See also 
Fries (surname)
Ethnonymic surnames